Galloway House is a Category A listed country house in Sorbie, Dumfries and Galloway, Scotland.

History
Adjoining the estate village of Garlieston, on Wigtown Bay, the house was begun in 1740 for Lord Garlies, later sixth Earl of Galloway, to designs by John Douglas, assisted by John Baxter as site architect. Additions in 1841 were by the Edinburgh architect William Burn.

The house and estate were owned by the Earls of Galloway until 1908, when they were forced to sell up. The buyer was Sir Malcolm McEacharn, who developed the garden. In 1930 the house and park were sold again to Lady Forteviot, widow of John Dewar, 1st Baron Forteviot, of the Dewar's Whisky family. She died in 1940, when the house became a hospital for men injured during the Second World War. Lady Forteviot's step-grandson, Edward Strutt, added to the garden, but in 1947 the house was sold to Glasgow Corporation, and until 1976 was a boarding school. After that it was sold back into private ownership, firstly to an American, and then an Australian. In June 2011 the house was put on the market yet again, with an asking price of £1,500,000 which was reduced to £1,300,000 in 2013 and £595,000 in September 2014.

Notes

External links
Galloway House Gardens Trust website
Village of Garlieston website

Country houses in Dumfries and Galloway
Category A listed buildings in Dumfries and Galloway
Listed houses in Scotland
Inventory of Gardens and Designed Landscapes
Clan Stewart